A quantum dot laser is a semiconductor laser that uses quantum dots as the active laser medium in its light emitting region. Due to the tight confinement of charge carriers in quantum dots, they exhibit an electronic structure similar to atoms. Lasers fabricated from such an active media exhibit device performance that is closer to gas lasers, and avoid some of the negative aspects of device performance associated with traditional semiconductor lasers based on bulk or quantum well active media. Improvements in modulation bandwidth, lasing threshold, relative intensity noise, linewidth enhancement factor and temperature insensitivity have all been observed. The quantum dot active region may also be engineered to operate at different wavelengths by varying dot size and composition. This allows quantum dot lasers to be fabricated to operate at wavelengths previously not possible using semiconductor laser technology. One challenge in the further advances with quantum dot lasers is the presence of multicarrier Auger processes which increases the nonradiative rate upon population inversion. Auger processes are intrinsic to the material but, in contrast to bulk semiconductors, they can be engineered to some degree in quantum dots at the cost of reducing the radiative rate. Another obstacle to the specific goal of electrically-pumped quantum dot lasing is the generally weak conductivity of quantum dot films.

Devices based on quantum dot active media have found commercial application in medicine (laser scalpel, optical coherence tomography), display technologies (projection, laser TV), spectroscopy and telecommunications. A 10 Gbit/s quantum dot laser that is insensitive to temperature fluctuation for use in optical data communications and optical networks has been developed using this technology. The laser is capable of high-speed operation at 1.3 μm wavelengths, at temperatures from 20 °C to 70 °C. It works in optical data transmission systems, optical LANs and metro-access systems. In comparison to the performance of conventional strained quantum-well lasers of the past, the new quantum dot laser achieves significantly higher stability of temperature.

Newer, so called "Comb lasers" based on quantum dot lasers have been found to be capable of operating at wavelengths of ≥ 80 nm and be unaffected by temperatures between -20 °C and 90 °C, and allow higher accuracy with reduced fluctuations and less relative intensity noise.

In development are colloidal quantum dot lasers, which would use quantum confinement to change the optical properties of the semiconductor crystals (≤ 10 nm in diameter) through solution-based rearrangements of quantum dots.

See also
List of laser articles

References 

Semiconductor lasers
Quantum dots